Eskabon (also Romanized as Eskābon, Āskābon, and Eskaban; also known as Askabun) is a village in Jirandeh Rural District, Amarlu District, Rudbar County, Gilan Province, Iran. At the 2006 census, its population was 44, in 13 families.

References 

Populated places in Rudbar County